Joseph Sifakis (Greek: Ιωσήφ Σηφάκης) is a Greek-French computer scientist. He received the 2007 Turing Award, along with Edmund M. Clarke and E. Allen Emerson, for his work on model checking.

Biography
Joseph Sifakis was born in Heraklion, Crete in 1946 and lives in France. He studied Electrical Engineering at the National Technical University of Athens and Computer Science at the University of Grenoble under a French scholarship. He received his engineering doctorate in 1974 from the University of Grenoble, where he also received a state doctorate in 1979.

He is currently Research Director Emeritus for the Centre national de la recherche scientifique at VERIMAG laboratory near Grenoble, of which he is the founder. Sifakis has been a leading figure in the fields of Model Checking and Embedded Systems. He founded with Edmund M. Clarke and Amir Pnueli the CAV conference, organized for the first time in Grenoble in 1989. He has been the coordinator of the ARTIST European Network of Excellence for research on Embedded Systems (2004–2012).

Sifakis held the INRIA-Schneider endowed industrial chair (2008–2011) and has been a full professor and the Director of the «Rigorous System Design Laboratory » at the School of Computer and Communication Sciences of EPFL (2011–2016). He has been visiting professor at Tsinghua University (2011–2012) and is currently a visiting professor at SUSTech.

Sifakis has been the President of the Greek National Council for Research and Technology (2014–2016).

Work
Sifakis worked on system verification and the application of formal methods to system design. In his state doctorate he studied the principles of the algorithmic verification method known later as model checking. In 1982, this technique was applied in Jean-Pierre Queille's PhD to develop the CESAR verification tool.

Sifakis was the director of VERIMAG for fourteen years. Established initially as a mixed industrial laboratory between CNRS and Verilog SA., VERIMAG has collaborated with Airbus and Schneider Electric to develop methods and tools for the development of safety critical systems, in particular the SCADE synchronous programming environment based on the Lustre Language. Sifakis has worked on the verification of timed and hybrid systems with Thomas Henzinger and the synthesis of timed systems with Amir Pnueli and Oded Maler. He has participated to the development of verification tools including the IF toolset,  Kronos, CADP, and  TGV and has developed theory for coping with state explosion using abstraction techniques.

Over the past twenty years, his work has focused on rigorous component-based design using the BIP component framework and more recently the design of trustworthy autonomous systems, self-driving cars in particular.

Awards

 Turing Award, 2007
 Leonardo da Vinci Medal, 2012
 Grand Officer of the National Order of Merit, France, 2008
 Commander of the Legion of Honor, France, 2011
Member of the French Academy of Sciences, 2010
Member of Academia Europaea, 2008
Member of the French Academy of Engineering, 2008
Member of the American Academy of Arts and Sciences, 2015
Member of the National Academy of Engineering, 2017
Foreign member of the Chinese Academy of Sciences, 2019

References

External links

Personal homepage
Turing Award announcement
List of publications: https://dblp.org/pid/s/JosephSifakis.html

1946 births
Living people
Scientists from Heraklion
Turing Award laureates
Commandeurs of the Légion d'honneur
Research directors of the French National Centre for Scientific Research
Grenoble Alpes University alumni
National Technical University of Athens alumni